John Aitken may refer to:
John Aitken (music publisher) (c. 1745–1831), Scottish-American music publisher
John the Painter or John Aitken (1752–1777)
John Aitken (surgeon) (died 1790), Scottish surgeon
John Aitken (editor) (1793–1833), Scottish editor
John Aitken (meteorologist) (1839–1919)
John Aitken (politician) (1849–1921), mayor of Wellington, New Zealand
John Aitken (footballer, born 1870), Scottish footballer
Johnny Aitken (1885–1918), racing driver
John Aitken (footballer, born 1894) (c. 1894–1917), Scottish footballer
John Aitken (biologist), British-born Australian-based reproductive biologist

See also
John Aiken (disambiguation)
Jonathan Aitken (born 1942), British politician 
John Aitkin (disambiguation)